Egan is a city in Moody County, South Dakota, United States. The population was 241 at the 2020 census.

The city has the name of a railroad employee.

Geography

Egan is located at  (43.998971, -96.649434), along the Big Sioux River.

Egan has been assigned the ZIP code 57024 and the FIPS place code 18460.

Demographics

2010 census
As of the census of 2010, there were 278 people, 117 households, and 76 families residing in the city. The racial makeup of the city was 86.3% White, 8.6% Native American, 0.7% Asian, 0.4% from other races, and 4.0% from two or more races. Hispanic or Latino of any race were 2.2% of the population.

There were 117 households, of which 25.6% had children under the age of 18 living with them, 51.3% were married couples living together, 7.7% had a female householder with no husband present, 6.0% had a male householder with no wife present, and 35.0% were non-families. 30.8% of all households were made up of individuals, and 10.3% had someone living alone who was 65 years of age or older. The average household size was 2.38 and the average family size was 2.92.

The median age in the city was 41.6 years. 23.7% of residents were under the age of 18; 5.9% were between the ages of 18 and 24; 24.5% were from 25 to 44; 31% were from 45 to 64; and 15.1% were 65 years of age or older. The gender makeup of the city was 51.8% male and 48.2% female.

2000 census
As of the census of 2000, there were 265 people, 111 households, and 67 families residing in the city. The population density was 380.5 people per square mile (146.2/km2). There were 119 housing units at an average density of 170.9 per square mile (65.6/km2). The racial makeup of the city was 93.96% White, 4.91% Native American, and 1.13% from two or more races.

There were 111 households, out of which 34.2% had children under the age of 18 living with them, 47.7% were married couples living together, 7.2% had a female householder with no husband present, and 39.6% were non-families. 34.2% of all households were made up of individuals, and 13.5% had someone living alone who was 65 years of age or older. The average household size was 2.39 and the average family size was 3.15.

In the city, the population was spread out, with 26.8% under the age of 18, 7.2% from 18 to 24, 28.7% from 25 to 44, 24.9% from 45 to 64, and 12.5% who were 65 years of age or older. The median age was 36 years. For every 100 females, there were 115.4 males. For every 100 females age 18 and over, there were 110.9 males.

The median income for a household in the city was $26,979, and the median income for a family was $30,000. Males had a median income of $25,357 versus $17,188 for females. The per capita income for the city was $13,392. About 1.4% of families and 5.7% of the population were below the poverty line, including 2.2% of those under the age of eighteen and 20.0% of those 65 or over.

References

Cities in South Dakota
Cities in Moody County, South Dakota